St Andrew's School is an independent, co-educational, Anglican primary school, located at Walkerville an inner eastern suburb of Adelaide, South Australia. The School was established in 1850 by St Andrew's Church to accommodate local children living in the 40 houses that made up Walkerville.  The original School House is still used today as part of the new Gymnasium and Performing Arts Centre.  St Andrew's School caters for approximately 400 students from the Early Learning Centre (ELC) to Year 7 with a strong Music Programme and a wide range of Co-curricular electives including Art, Drama, Tennis Coaching, Gymnastics, ICT Club, Chess and Debating.

St Andrew's School is affiliated with the Association of Independent Schools of South Australia (AISSA) and the Independent Primary School Heads of Australia (IPSHA). It is also a recognised International Baccularate (IB) school in South Australia.

Academic results
St Andrew's is consistently a top performing primary school in South Australia.

In 2018 its year 5 performance was ranked as the number 1 co-ed school based on National Assessment Program – Literacy and Numeracy (NAPLAN) results 

In 2018 its year 7 NAPLAN performance was ranked first out of the over 125 primary schools in Adelaide with a score of 606, 5 points higher than second place at 601.

In 2021 it was ranked the second best South Australian primary school by BetterEducation, MyChoiceSchools and Homestay. Furthermore, BetterEducation gave the school an overall score of 100/100 every year from 2011 to 2020 except for 2019, where it received a 99/100.

In 2019, Tim Williams, a writer for The Advertiser (Adelaide) wrote that their study of the NAPLAN results between 2014 and 2018 showed that St Andrew's was the only South Australian school to make it into the nation's top 100 schools.

Co-curricular activities
For music students the school offers string orchestra, full range orchestra, three concert bands, choirs, handbells and various other ensembles.

Sporting opportunities include the annual swimming carnival, cross country run, sports days, gymnastics, dance, weekly inter-school sport (of which the school offers 12), representation in SAPSASA district and state teams for talented athletes.

As well as this the school offers debating, drama, art and Tournament of Minds.

Jackie Becher is the Principal of the school and Kristian Downing is the Chair of the School Board.

References

Anglican primary schools in Adelaide
Educational institutions established in 1850
International Baccalaureate schools in Australia
1850 establishments in Australia